Almenar is a municipality in the comarca of the Segrià in Catalonia, Spain. 
The Battle of Almenar, one of the main battles of the War of the Spanish Succession, was fought in the hills close to this town on 27 July 1710.

Demography

See also
Battle of Almenar

References

External links 

 Pàgina web de l'Ajuntament
 Government data pages 

Municipalities in Segrià
Populated places in Segrià